Cappriccieo M. Scates (born 23 May 1969), also known as "Capp", is a member of the United States recording industry. He previously held positions as president and Chief Executive Officer at Mytrell Records, Executive General Manager at Arrow Records, Head of National Radio Promotions at Ruffhouse/Columbia Records, and Senior Director of Writer and Publisher Relations at SESAC. As the former Senior Director of Writer and Publisher Relations for SESAC, his direct signings include: Day 26, RichGirl, Bone Crusher, Jacob Latimore, Q Parker of 112, Nikeshia Briscoe, Rico Love, Jay Fenix, The Platinum Brothers, BXC, Atozzio Towns, Eric Sire, Miykal Snoody, Nas Star, Travis Greene, and London to name a few.

Biography 
Cappriccieo began his music business career as a drummer, which eventually led to him providing independent promotional services for Sony Music, Death Row Records, Tommy Boy Records, Universal Music Group, and Atlantic Records, promoting the careers of artists such as Alicia Keys, Boyz II Men, and Bone Thugs-n-Harmony. His work in promotions led to a position as Director of National Radio Promotions for Ruffhouse/Columbia Records, where he was responsible for promoting the careers of artists such as Fugees, Cypress Hill, and Kris Kross.

In 2006, Cappriccieo was named associate director, Writer/Publisher Relations for SESAC's first satellite office in Atlanta, GA, where he was responsible for recruiting songwriters and publishers. Prior to joining SESAC, he was Director of Operations for PM Music Group, where he represented songwriters whose credits include Michael Jackson and Beyoncé. In addition, he is author of “10 Steps to Successfully Managing Recording Artists,” and "The 11th Step I Missed," which were published in October 2004 and June 2018 respectfully.

In 2011, Atlanta Mayor Kasim Reed presented Mr. Scates with the Phoenix Award, which replaced the “Key to the City” that was awarded by previous mayors. Mr. Scates also received a proclamation from the Atlanta City Council proclaiming September 22, 2011 as “CAPPRICCIEO SCATES DAY.”
Mr. Scates holds a Masters in Business Administration from Averett University where he was selected to the National Dean's List for academic excellence. In April 2016, Mr. Scates received a Doctor of Philosophy and was awarded an Ambassadorial Appointment in Special Consultative Status with the United Nations Economic and Social Council (ECOSOC). This is the highest level of accreditation that is awarded internationally to all designates.

Furthermore, Ambassador Scates proudly served his country as a soldier in the U.S. Army (6 years) and U.S. Army National Guard (14 years); he retired in July 2013 after completing 20 years of service.

Cappriccieo is a former member of the Atlanta Chapter Board of Governors for the National Academy of Recording Arts and Sciences (NARAS), and a member of the Atlanta Chapter Board for the National Association of Record Industry Professionals (NARIP). “Cappriccieo has done more for NARIP Atlanta than almost any other individual and laid out the red carpet for our organization in his city. He is a consummate professional, with years of experience in the industry as a record executive and personal artist manager...[Capp] is a connector and a valued colleague, and he epitomizes qualities of today’s most successful professionals [with] a desire to learn and grow, and to help others achieve their goals," says NARIP President Tess Taylor. He is a former member of The Georgia Music Industry Task Force, which served to consult Georgia Governor Sonny Perdue on the economic impact of music, film and entertainment during his last term in office.

In September 2018, Ambassador Scates was honored as a Dior Man (Christian Dior). The Dior Men are noted trailblazers for their business engagements, sense of style, and community & philanthropic activities.

Ambassador Scates was also Knighted on September 14, 2018, into The Royal Order of Knights of Malta of Africa and The Diaspora, with all the Rights, Lights, Honors, Privileges and Prerogatives which belong to this Order. This order is noted of record as No. U.S. 2018/DAR5028/#0002 on the 30th day of the month of July 2018, Philadelphia, Pennsylvania USA. He is hereby further known as Sir Cappriccieo Montrell Scates, Sr.

Sir Scates was selected as a Black Enterprise BE Modern Man in October 2019 http://www.blackenterprise.com and as a consultant to the Congressional Black Caucus https://cbc.house.gov. He was the second person in history to receive the Congressional Black Caucus Lapel Pin (designed by The Royal House of the Dairamontcy of Africa) https://www.facebook.com/DairamontcyOfAfrica/, after Congressman Rangel of New York: Charles Rangel who received the pin first.

Sir Scates was hired at www.soundroyalties.com in July 2020 as the Director of Regional Business Development and Artist Relations.

Sir Scates prides himself on his personal slogan, “Your floor is someone else’s ceiling. Always be appreciative for where you are, but never stop trying to reach the next floor.”

References

External links 
 Mytrell Records
 Arrow Records
 SESAC
 "10 Steps to Successfully Managing Recording Artists: A Guide to Effective Artist Management"
  "The 11th Step I Missed"
 Linked in "Cappriccieo M. Scates"

1969 births
Living people